Free Radical Biology and Medicine is a peer-reviewed scientific journal and official journal of the  Society for Redox Biology and Medicine. The journal covers research on redox biology, signaling, biological chemistry and medical implications of free radicals, reactive species, oxidants and antioxidants.

Abstracting and indexing 
The journal is abstracted and indexed in ADONIS, BIOSIS, CAB Abstracts, Chemical Abstracts, Current Contents, EMBASE, EMBiology, MEDLINE, Science Citation Index, Scopus and Toxicology Abstracts.

External links 
 
 FRBM Society

Biochemistry journals
Biweekly journals
English-language journals
Elsevier academic journals